The Arizona Complex League White Sox are a Rookie-level affiliate of the Chicago White Sox, competing in the Arizona Complex League of Minor League Baseball. The team plays its home games at Camelback Ranch in Phoenix, Arizona. The team is composed mainly of players who are in their first year of professional baseball either as draftees or non-drafted free agents from the United States, Canada, Dominican Republic, Venezuela, and other countries.

History
The team first competed in the Arizona League (AZL) from 1998 to 2002. The team played at facilities in Tucson from 1998 to 2000, and Phoenix from 2001 to 2002.  The team was formed after the major-league Chicago White Sox moved their spring training headquarters from Sarasota, Florida, to Tucson Electric Park after the 1997 season. The move effectively transplanted their Rookie-level Gulf Coast League White Sox across the country to the Arizona League. The AZL White Sox compiled a record of 115–161 (.417) during their first incarnation, never posting a winning mark.

The team departed the Arizona League in 2003, and was absent from the league for 11 seasons.

At the close of the 2013 season, the major-league White Sox announced their intention to sever their 19-year-long relationship with the Bristol White Sox of the Appalachian League, to be replaced with an AZL team operating from the team's spring training base at Camelback Ranch in Glendale, Arizona. The Pittsburgh Pirates replaced the White Sox in Bristol, Virginia, and in the Appalachian League as the new owners and operators of the Bristol Pirates.

The White Sox' Rookie-level team has competed in Arizona since 2014. The team shares the Camelback Ranch stadium with the Arizona League Dodgers, whose parent team, the Los Angeles Dodgers, also train at the Glendale facility. Prior to the 2021 season, the Arizona League was renamed as the Arizona Complex League (ACL).

Roster

Notable alumni (1998–2002)
 
Edwin Almonte
Lorenzo Barceló
Rocky Biddle
Joe Borchard
Josh Fogg
Matt Ginter
Andy González
Charlie Haeger
Brandon McCarthy
Gustavo Molina
Michael Morse
Arnie Muñoz
Humberto Quintero
David Sanders
Joe Valentine
Chris Young

Former Major League All-Star catcher Tony Peña began his career as a manager with the 1998 AZL White Sox.  He later managed the MLB Kansas City Royals (2003–2005) and was a coach for the New York Yankees (2006–2017).

References

External links
 Official website
List of Chicago White Sox minor league affiliates from Baseball Reference

Arizona Complex League teams
Defunct Arizona Complex League teams
Chicago White Sox minor league affiliates
Professional baseball teams in Arizona
Baseball teams established in 1998
1998 establishments in Arizona